Massimo Brancaccio, also known by the stage names Billy More and Max Coveri (3 February 1965 – 14 August 2005), was an Italian drag queen and music artist based in Milan.

Biography
Brancaccio first started out as an Italo disco singer in the 1980s, performing several songs under the Max Coveri alias (which was originally used by Mauro Farina and later by Maurizio De Jorio), as well as being the model.

The Billy More project began when Brancaccio met Roberto Santini (RSDJ), a disc jockey in Zip Club, Milan. The actual vocalist of Billy More's songs is John Biancale.

Billy More's first single, "Up & Down (Do not Fall in Love with Me)", released in 2000, reached #5 in the Italian music chart, #14 in the Austrian music chart, and #21 in the German music chart. More released another single, "Come On and Do It (Saturdaynightlife)" in 2001.

He released the singles "I Keep On Burning", "Weekend", and "Dance" in 2002 and 2003. He cooperated with DJ Speciale to produce another single called "Try Me". He released his last single "Gimme Love" in 2005.

He died from an illness resulting from leukemia in Milan on 14 August 2005. He is buried in a cemetery in Castelletto sopra Ticino, Piedmont.

Discography

Singles

References

External links
 Billy More on Discogs
 Billy More interview on CulturaGay.it
 Billy More death article

1965 births
2005 deaths
Deaths from cancer in Lombardy
Deaths from leukemia
Italian drag queens
Eurodance musicians
Gay singers
Italian pop singers
Italian Italo disco musicians
Italian gay musicians
Italian LGBT singers
Singers from Milan
20th-century Italian male singers
20th-century Italian LGBT people
21st-century Italian LGBT people